Heliconius wallacei, the Wallace's longwing, is a butterfly of the family Nymphalidae. It was described by Tryon Reakirt in 1866. It is found from Venezuela and Trinidad to southern Brazil and Peru. The habitat consists of lowland rainforests.

The wingspan is 70–75 mm.

The larvae are gregarious and mostly feed on Passiflora species from the subgenus Distephana. Full-grown larvae have a maroon body and a brown head and reach a length of about 10 mm.

Subspecies
H. w. wallacei (Brazil: Pará)
H. w. araguaia Brown, 1976 (Brazil: Goiás)
H. w. colon Weymer, 1891 (Surinam, Brazil: Amazonas)
H. w. flavescens Weymer, 1891 (Ecuador, Peru, Guyana, Bolivia)
H. w. kayei Neustetter, 1929 (Trinidad)
H. w. mimulinus Butler, 1873 (Colombia)

References

wallacei
Nymphalidae of South America
Butterflies of Trinidad and Tobago
Lepidoptera of Brazil
Lepidoptera of French Guiana
Lepidoptera of Venezuela
Fauna of the Amazon
Butterflies described in 1866
Taxa named by Tryon Reakirt